Leucanopsis ishima is a moth of the family Erebidae. It was described by William Schaus in 1941. It is found in Brazil.

References

ishima
Moths described in 1941